Claude Julien may refer to:

Claude Julien (ice hockey) (born 1960), Canadian ice hockey coach
Claude Julien (journalist) (1925–2005), French journalist
Claude Julien, mayor of Lescure-d'Albigeois, France